VV Dongen is a football club from Dongen, Netherlands. VV Dongen has approximately 900 members making 11 senior teams (1 women team), 12 junior teams (2 girl teams) and 25 pupil teams (23 girl teams). It plays at sports accommodation de Biezen in Dongen.

History

20th century 
The club was founded in 1923, when DVC and Olympia merged. The club's first name was Dongense Sportvereniging Dongen-Vooruit (Dongen Sports club Dongen Forward). The club colors were black and white. In 1944 the club's name was changed to VV Dongen. Four years earlier, the colors were changed to yellow and blue.

21st century 
In 2008, Dongen won its first Tweede Klasse section championship. It promoted to the Eerste Klasse, and in 2010 to the Hoofdklasse through another section championship. In 2016 it won a section championship in the Hoofdklasse and promoted to the Derde Divisie.

In 2017, at the end of the first season in the Derde Divisie, it ended third and participated in the qualification rounds for the Tweede Divisie. Subsequent season was still strong as Dongen ended fourth. In 2019, it ended 10th. Two Covid-19 interrupted season followed after which, in 2022, it finished at a decent 7th. Late October 2022, Dongen is dead last in the Derde Divisie with zero points out of 11 games.

References

External links
 Official site

Football clubs in the Netherlands
1923 establishments in the Netherlands
Association football clubs established in 1923
Football clubs in North Brabant
Sport in Dongen